James Russell Keays (commonly known as Russell Keays) (30 October 1913 – 10 March 1995) was a Canadian industrialist and politician. He was a mayor in Quebec and later a Progressive Conservative party member of the House of Commons of Canada.

Born in Newport, Quebec,  he attained a Bachelor of Arts at University of St. Joseph's College. In 1949, he became mayor of Gaspé, Quebec and held that post until at least 1960. He also founded La Cie de Bois de Baie Sud (South Bay Lumber) in the Gaspé region which today is known as KEGA.

He was first elected at the Îles-de-la-Madeleine riding in the 1958 general election. After a term in Parliament, Keays was defeated in the 1962 federal election at Îles-de-la-Madeleine by Maurice Sauvé of the Liberal party. In the 1965 election, Keays won the Gaspé riding and returned to Parliament, but was again defeated in the following election in 1968 by Alexandre Cyr of the Liberal party.

Keays did not seek any further re-election after that, but remained active within the Progressive Conservative party. He was part of a campaign team for Charles-Eugène Marin for the 1984 federal election. However, he and three other campaigners were fined for Canada Elections Act infractions in April 1986 for hiring scrutineers outside the purview of Marin's official agent.

References

External links
 

1913 births
1995 deaths
Members of the House of Commons of Canada from Quebec
Progressive Conservative Party of Canada MPs
Mayors of places in Quebec